Tropotianka is a popular folk dance from southwestern Ukraine. It is performed by amateurs, professional Ukrainian dance ensembles as well as other performers of folk dances. Has a common origin or is derived from the Romanian dance "Tropotita" (Rom. a tropai, a tropoti - to beat the rhythm with the feet).

Ukrainian dances